Metrosideros macropus, the lehua mamo or 'ohi'a, is a species of tree in the eucalyptus family, Myrtaceae. It is endemic to the island of Oahu in the Hawaiian Islands.  It is closely related to the widespread and highly variable ōhia lehua (M. polymorpha), found throughout the islands.  Lehua mamo, however, is only found in the Koolau mountains.  It is distinguished from M. polymorpha by the elongate leaf petioles (1/3-1/2 as long as the leaf blades, compared to less than 1/4 as long in M. polymorpha) and the flowers are usually yellow.  The latter character is also found in some varieties of M. polymorpha, which normally has red flowers, but occasionally the flowers of M. macropus are red as well.

References

macropus
Endemic flora of Hawaii
Trees of Hawaii
Flora without expected TNC conservation status